Katha depressa, the buff footman, is a moth of the family Erebidae found in Asia and Europe. It was first described by Eugenius Johann Christoph Esper in 1787.

Technical description and variation

The length of the forewings is 15–17 mm. Both wings dark brown grey, with the costa of the forewing and the fringes light bright yellow, especially in the female. The ground colour is often more or less lightened with ochreous, sometimes almost clay-colour (ochreola Hbn.), or nearly whitish (helveola Ochs.) or of an indefinite intermediate shade (luteola Hbn.). In pavescens Butl. from Hokkaido (Island of Yezo), the wings are dirty greyish yellow; the hindwing lighter.

Subspecies
Katha deplana deplana
Katha deplana pavescens (Butler, 1877) (Russia: Middle Amur, Primorye, Sakhalin, Kunashir; Korea; Japan)

Biology
Larvae are a dirty lead-grey colour, bearing a yellow dorsal stripe with dark edges and three raised black transverse spots anteriorly, posteriorly and in the centre, and black markings laterally. The larvae feed on lichen and algae, especially on conifer trees, but also on oak (Quercus species) and heathers (Calluna species). Until June, on lichens on trees. Pupa glossy red brown. The moths are found singly but are not rare and can be fly in June to September.

They can be found during the day resting in trees and bushes and can also be found by beating from young conifers.

Distribution
It is found from western Europe east through the Palearctic (northern Asia Minor, Crimea, Abkhazia, Transcaucasia, southern Siberia, Middle Amur, Primorye, Sakhalin, Kunashir, Zhejiang) to Korea and Japan.

References

External links
  Taxonomy
 Eilema depressaon Lepidoptera of Belgium 
 Eilema depressa on Lepiforum e.V.
 Eilema depressa on De Vlinderstichting 

Lithosiina
Moths described in 1787
Moths of Asia
Moths of Europe
Moths of Japan
Taxa named by Eugenius Johann Christoph Esper